David Alan Young (born 31 January 1965) is an English former footballer who played as a left back in the Football League for Darlington in the 1980s. He also played non-league football for Spennymoor United.

References

1965 births
Living people
People from Trimdon
Footballers from County Durham
English footballers
Association football defenders
Darlington F.C. players
Spennymoor United F.C. players
English Football League players